Kwidzyn (Latin: Quedin; Old Prussian: Kwēdina) is a town in northern Poland on the Liwa River. With a population of 37,975, it is the capital of Kwidzyn County in the Pomeranian Voivodeship.

Geography
It is part of the region of Powiśle.

History

The Pomesanian settlement called Kwedis existed in the 11th century. In 1232, the Teutonic Knights built the castle and established the town of Marienwerder (now Kwidzyn) the following year. In 1243, the Bishopric of Pomesania received both the town and castle from the Teutonic Order as fiefs, and the settlement became the seat of the Bishops of Pomesania within Prussia. The town was populated by artisans and traders, originating from towns in the northern parts of the Holy Roman Empire. A Teutonic knight, Werner von Orseln, was murdered in Marienburg (Malbork) in 1330. He was among the first to be buried in the newly erected cathedral of the town.

St. Dorothea of Montau lived in Marienwerder from 1391 until her death in 1394; future pilgrims visiting her shrine would contribute to the flourishing economy.

The Prussian Confederation, which opposed Teutonic rule, was founded in the town on March 14, 1440. The town itself joined the organization on 17 April 1440. Upon the request of the organization in 1454 Polish King Casimir IV Jagiellon incorporated the region and town to the Kingdom of Poland, and the Thirteen Years' War broke out. In 1466, after the defeat of the Teutonic Knights in the war, the town became part of Poland as a fief held by the Teutonic Knights. In 1525, the Teutonic state was transformed into a secular and Lutheran duchy under the last Grand Master of the Teutonic Order Albert, a political foundation only possible with the consent of the Polish King Sigismund I the Old. The town was visited by Polish Kings Sigismund II Augustus in 1552 and Stephen Báthory in 1576. In 1618 the ducal rights were inherited by the Brandenburg branch of the House of Hohenzollern, remaining under Polish suzerainty. In 1657 the Brandenburg dukes severed ties with the Polish crown and in 1701 elevated their realm to the sovereign Kingdom of Prussia.

The town of Marienwerder meanwhile had become the capital of the District of Marienwerder. In 1772, the Marienwerder district was integrated into the newly established Prussian Province of West Prussia, which consisted mostly of territories annexed in the First Partition of Poland.

By the enlargement of its administrative functions, the population of the town started to grow and in 1885, it numbered 8,079. This population was composed mostly of Lutheran inhabitants, many of whom were engaged in trades connected with the manufacturing of sugar, vinegar and brewing as well as dairy farming, fruit growing and the industrial construction of machines. In 1910, Marienwerder had a population of 12,983 of which 12,408 (95.6%) were German-speaking and 346 (2.7%) were Polish-speaking.

As a result of the Treaty of Versailles after World War I, the district of Marienwerder was divided. The parts west of the Vistula were incorporated into the Polish Second Republic, which had just regained its independence. The parts east of the Vistula, to which the town of Marienwerder belonged, was to take part in the East Prussian plebiscite, which was organized under the control of the League of Nations. The Inter-Allied Commission with nearly 2,000 troops often favored the Germans, and its services towards Poles were often delayed and limited, while the administration remained under German control. The town was home to the Polish Warmian Plebiscite Committee and the Committee for Polish Affairs, which, however, had to operate partly secretly. On May 16, 1920, the largest Polish plebiscite demonstration in Powiśle took place in the town, and Poles had to organize defenses against attacks by German militias. These conditions combined with German electoral fraud resulted in 7,811 votes given to remain in East Prussia, and therefore Germany, and only 362 for Poland. Afterwards, anti-Polish terror intensified.

According to the Geneva Conventions, the Polish community was entitled to its own schools, and from 1934 local Poles strove to establish a Polish school. The Germans blocked the establishment of the school, and Polish organizations filed 100 complaints to the German administration before the Polish private gymnasium was finally established on November 10, 1937. Local German press incited the Germans against the Polish school, and in 1938 a fourteen-year-old boy was shot at the school playground, which the German police ignored, and the shooter was not caught. The Germans, especially the Hitler Youth, repeatedly harassed and attacked Polish students and devastated the school. It was forcibly closed down on August 25, 1939. The German police surrounded the Polish school and arrested its principal Władysław Gębik, 13 teachers, other staff and 162 students, who were imprisoned in Tapiau (today Gvardeysk), and then deported elsewhere. Later on, students under the age of 18 were released, older students were forcibly conscripted into the Wehrmacht, while teachers and staff were deported to concentration camps, where most of them were murdered. The head of the local Polish Bank Ludowy was also arrested, and the local Polish consulate was cut off from telephone lines, nevertheless the state radio in Poland still provided information regarding the attack on the Polish school on the same day.

Nazi Germany co-formed the Einsatzgruppe V in the town, which then entered several Polish cities and towns, including Grudziądz, Mława, Ciechanów, Łomża and Siedlce, to commit various atrocities against Poles during the German invasion of Poland, which started World War II. Many Poles expelled from German-occupied Poland were deported to forced labour in the town's vicinity. The Germans also operated a subcamp of the Stutthof concentration camp in the town. On January 30, 1945 in the last months of World War II, the town was captured by the Soviet Red Army. The Red Army established a war hospital in the town for 20,000 people. The town centre was burned and pillaged by Soviet soldiers.

After World War II, the region became again part of Poland by the Potsdam Agreement, although with a Soviet-installed communist regime, which stayed in power until the 1980s. Most of the German-speaking people of the town and district fled or were expelled in accordance to the Agreement, and were replaced with Poles, many of whom had themselves been expelled from the Polish areas annexed by the Soviet Union. In 1947, Ukrainians from the Soviet border regions were forcibly settled in the area as a result of Operation Vistula. From 1975 to 1998, it was administratively located in the Elbląg Voivodeship. In 1982, the communists brutally crushed the protest of interned anti-communist oppositionists.

Points of interest
The main landmark is the Kwidzyn Castle, a 14th century Brick Gothic Ordensburg castle and cathedral complex of the Pomesanian Cathedral Chapter, which now houses a museum. It is listed as a Historic Monument of Poland. The adjacent co-cathedral of St. John the Evangelist was built between 1343 and 1384, and serves as a co-cathedral of the Roman Catholic Diocese of Elbląg. It contains the tombs of three Grand Masters of the Teutonic Knights as well as numerous bishops. A bridge connects the castle to a sewer tower which was once situated on a river that has since dried up.

Other sights include the Appellate Court for Kwidzyn County, the town hall, the Holy Trinity church, the Saint Padre Pio chapel, various government buildings and old townhouses.

Economy
A branch of International Paper is located in Kwidzyn, as is the Kwidzyn School of Management.

The second biggest employer in Kwidzyn is Jabil, a global electronics manufacturing services company.

The city has lower average crime and unemployment rates when compared with the national average rates of Poland. These lower rates are attributed to sports programmes for youth such as MMTS Kwidzyn (handball) and MTS Basket Kwidzyn.

Sports
The town's main sports clubs are:
MMTS Kwidzyn, handball club which plays in the Polish Superliga (top division; as of 2022), runners-up in season 2009–10
Basket Kwidzyn, basketball club which plays in the lower leagues, but played in the Polish Basketball League (top division) in the past
Rodło Kwidzyn, football club which plays in the lower leagues

Transport
The intersections of Polish National roads 55 and 90, Voivodeship roads 521 and 532, and Voivodeship roads 518 and 588, are located either in Kwidzyn or just outside of the town limits. There is also a train station.

Notable people
 Dorothea of Montau (1347–1394), hermitess and visionary of 14th century Germany, canonized in 1976.
 Paul Speratus (1484–1551), Catholic priest who became a Protestant preacher, reformer and hymn-writer
 Eduard Heinrich von Flottwell (1786–1865), Prussian Staatsminister and Regierungspräsident of Marienwerder in 1825
 Hans Adolf Erdmann von Auerswald (1792–1848), Prussian general and politician
 Karl Ludwig Hencke (1793–1866 in Marienwerder), amateur astronomer and discoverer of minor planets
 Rudolf von Auerswald (1795–1866), Prime Minister of Prussia
 Carl Julius Meyer von Klinggräff (1809–1879), German botanist
 Hermann von Dechend (1814–1890), first President of the Reichsbank
 Heinrich Julian Schmidt (1818–1886), German journalist and historian of literature 
 Rudolf Heidenhain (1834–1897), German physiologist
 Gustav Cohn (1840–1919), German economist, particularly re. public finance
 Elard von Oldenburg-Januschau (1855-1937 in Marienwerder), German Junker and conservative politician.
 Kurt Rosenfeld (1877–1943), lawyer and politician
 Józef Krasnowolski (1879–1939), Polish painter
 Fritz Goerdeler (1886–1945), German jurist and resistance fighter; mayor 1920-33
 Joachim Witthöft (1887–1966), general
 Kurt-Jürgen Freiherr von Lützow (1892–1961), general
 Ida Siekmann (1902–1961) nurse, first victim of Berlin Wall
 Ernst Schiffner (1903–1980), German actor and director
 Ernst Tillich (1910–1985), German theologian
 Bernard Friese (1927–2010), co-founder of Gilbern cars
 Hardy Rodenstock (born 1941), music publisher and manager; dealer in old and rare wine
  (1947–2006), Polish test pilot
 Wiesław Hartman (born 1950), Polish show jumping equestrian, silver medallist in the 1980 Summer Olympics  
 Wojciech Belon (1952–1985), Polish poet, songwriter and folksinger
 Izabela Tomaszewska (1955–2010), Polish government official and archeologist
 Tomasz Piotr Nowak (born 1956), Polish politician
 Jacek Borcuch (born 1970), Polish actor and film director
 Marek Szulen (born 1975), Polish composer of electronic music, lives in the Netherlands
 Maciej Silski (born 1976), Polish singer
 Patryk Rombel (born 1983), Polish handball coach, currently coaching the Polish national team

Burials
 Werner von Orseln (c.1280–1330) the 17th Grand Master of the Teutonic Order
 Otto Friedrich von der Groeben (1657–1728) a Prussian explorer, officer and German Generalleutnant in Polish service

Gallery

International relations

Kwidzyn is twinned with:

References

Sources
Stephen Turnbull: Crusader Castles of the Teutonic Knights: The Red-Brick Castles of Prussia 1230-1466, October 2003 (eBook, PDF)

External links

Municipal website 
Kwidzyn School of Management
Kwidzyn City Portal 

Cities and towns in Pomeranian Voivodeship
Kwidzyn County